Matveyevka is a rural locality (a village) in Volosatovskoye Rural Settlement, Selivanovsky District, Vladimir Oblast, Russia. The population was 26 as of 2010.

Geography 
Matveyevka is located on the Kolp River, 15 km northwest of Krasnaya Gorbatka (the district's administrative centre) by road. Kopnino is the nearest rural locality.

References 

Rural localities in Selivanovsky District